Colossos - Kampf der Giganten, German for Colossos: Battle of the Giants, is a wooden roller coaster located at Heide Park in Soltau, Lower Saxony, Germany. Manufactured by Intamin, the roller coaster opened as simply Colossos in 2001. Unlike traditional wooden coasters, its track was prefabricated, laser-cut in a factory to a high degree of precision, with sections designed to snap together like Lego pieces. Some of its planks were tightly bonded in multiple layers instead of traditionally nailed together by hand. The roller coaster closed in 2016 due to deteriorating track conditions and reopened in 2019 after refurbishment.

Construction 
The coaster's "plug and play" design sped up construction and reduced labor costs. Three other prefabricated wooden roller coasters have since been built: Balder at Liseberg, El Toro at Six Flags Great Adventure in Jackson, New Jersey, and T Express at Everland in South Korea.

Colossos was the first wooden coaster with magnetic brakes just before the return to station, making its final braking very smooth and comfortable compared to that of coasters with friction claw brakes.

2016 closing 

On July 28, 2016, Colossos was shut down and all paths to it were blocked. Heide Park announced that inspections had revealed significant problems with the coaster's track, and that repairs would cost over €10 million.

Reopening plans 

In early January 2018, Heide Park announced that the entire track surface of Colossos would be replaced and that the ride would reopen for the 2019 summer season. The renovation is expected to cost around €12 million.
In late 2018, the ride's new name, logo and backstory were confirmed. Colossos would become Colossos: Kampf der Giganten in 2019.

Awards

References

External links 

Heide Park

Roller coasters in Germany
Roller coasters operated by Merlin Entertainments
Roller coasters introduced in 2001